Roosa Timonen (born 20 February 1997 in Tampere) is a Finnish tennis player.

Playing for Finland at the Fed Cup, Timonen has a win–loss record of 3–1.

ITF finals (0–1)

Doubles (0–1)

References

External links 
 
 
 

1997 births
Living people
Sportspeople from Tampere
Finnish female tennis players
20th-century Finnish women
21st-century Finnish women